Parliamentary elections were held in Greece in June 1874. The United Opposition won 96 of the 190 seats. Dimitrios Voulgaris remained Prime Minister.

Results

References

Greece
Parliamentary elections in Greece
1874 in Greece
Greece
1870s in Greek politics